The Remix Collection may refer to:

The Remix Collection (Boyz II Men album), 1995
The Remix Collection (Kim Wilde album),
The Remix Collection (Natacha Atlas album), 2000
Remix Collection (CeCe Peniston album)
Remix Collection (Kai Tracid album)
Remix Collection (Show Luo album), 2010
Remix Collection (Cory Lee album), 2008